Igerøya is an island in Vega Municipality in Nordland county, Norway. The  island is located just northeast of the island of Vega. The two islands are connected by a series of bridges over small islands. Igerøya is connected to the island of Tjøtta by a regular ferry route. In 2015, the island had 91 residents. Most of the inhabitants of the island live along the eastern side of the island.

See also
List of islands of Norway

References

Vega, Norway
Islands of Nordland